Philip Lund (born September 5, 1989 in Vejle) is a Danish footballer who currently plays for indoor soccer team Tacoma Stars in United States.

Club career

Denmark
Lund began his career with hometown club Vejle Boldklub.  Between 2008 and 2011, Lund worked his way through the ranks of the club, including breaking into the senior squad for which he appeared in two Danish Superliga matches in 2009. In July 2010, Lund was loaned to Kolding FC before returning to Vejle in June 2011.  After leaving Vejle in December 2011, Lund signed for FC Fyn before leaving the club in 2013. Both Kolding and Fyn played in the Danish 1st Division, the second highest division in Danish football, during Lund's time with the clubs.

United States
On March 22, it was announced that Lund had signed with Seattle Sounders FC of Major League Soccer, along with Jamaican youth international Ashani Fairclough, after impressing assistant coach Ezra Hendrickson at a player combine.  Lund made his first league appearance for Seattle on April 13, 2013 coming on as a 74th-minute substitute for Steve Zakuani in a 0-0 draw with the New England Revolution. After scoring none and making 5 appearances  for the club, Lund was waived by Seattle at the end of the 2013 Major League Soccer season on 25 November 2013.

Following his release from the Sounders, Lund signed with Oklahoma City Energy FC, coached by fellow-Dane Jimmy Nielsen, of the USL Pro for the 2014 season. Lund experienced a strong start to his time at OKC, which included scoring three goals in 8 appearances. In April , he was  being sidelined with a hip injury which was expected to keep him out for 8 months.

Faroe Islands
After being released from Oklahoma City, Lund went on trial with his former club Vejle BK in Denmark. On 22 July 2015, Lund signed a one year contract for B36 Torshavn of the Effodeildin. He was released after the conclusion of the 2015 Faroe Islands Premier League season. He scored a total of 4 goals in 18 league appearances for the club.

Personal
Lund has a twin brother named Mitchell.

References

External links

1989 births
Living people
Danish men's footballers
Danish expatriate men's footballers
Vejle Boldklub players
Kolding FC players
Seattle Sounders FC players
OKC Energy FC players
Association football midfielders
Expatriate soccer players in the United States
Danish Superliga players
Major League Soccer players
USL Championship players
Denmark youth international footballers
People from Vejle Municipality
Tacoma Stars (2003–) players
Major Arena Soccer League players
Sportspeople from the Region of Southern Denmark